PS-7 Shikarpur-I is a constituency of the  Provincial Assembly of Sindh.

General elections 2013

General elections 2008

See also
 PS-6 Kashmore-III
 PS-8 Shikarpur-II

References

External links 
 Official Website of Government of Sindh

Constituencies of Sindh